Hollis Chair may refer to:
 Hollis Chair of Divinity, a Chair established at Harvard College
 Hollis Chair of Mathematics and Natural Philosophy, a Chair established at Harvard College